Symphony No. 50 may refer to:

Symphony No. 50 (Haydn)  in C major (Hoboken I/50) by Joseph Haydn, 1773–74
Symphony No. 50 (Hovhaness) (Op. 360, Mount St. Helens) by Alan Hovhaness, 1982
Symphony No. 50 (Mozart) in D major (K. 161/141a) by Wolfgang Amadeus Mozart, 1772

050